Vineyard Churches UK and Ireland (or VCUKI) is the national body for the Association of Vineyard Churches in the United Kingdom and Ireland. There are more than 100 churches under its direction. The organisation is both a registered charity (number 1099748) and a registered company (number 04839046).

History 
The Vineyard church was established in the UK by John and Eleanor Mumford. After visiting John Wimber in the US, the Mumfords returned to the UK to establish the first British Vineyard church, South West London Vineyard in 1987. VCUKI became its own national organisation in 1996, when it was released by the international body.

Leadership and structure
The Vineyard Churches UK and Ireland is headed by its national directors, John and Debby Wright, who officially took over from John and Eleanor Mumford in September 2015. There is then a Leadership Council, with members responsible for different specialisms within the church (church planting, church development, and financial and legal issues).

In addition to the central leadership, the UK and Ireland are divided into 13 areas. Each area is run by Area Leaders, who are responsible for that area of the country. Areas tend to hold their own training and events for the local people, leaders and churches.

John and Eleanor Mumford are the parents of Marcus Mumford of the band Mumford & Sons.

Evaluation
One of the first academic studies of a Vineyard church in the United Kingdom was Cory E. Labanow's Evangelicalism and the Emerging Church: A Congregational Study of a Vineyard Church. Within the congregation studied ("Jacobsfield Vineyard"), there was a common identity as an "emerging church".

However, Labanow reports that the meaning of this common identity was contested within the congregation. Even more significantly, the decentralised, non-creedal nature of the Vineyard churches in the UK and the Republic of Ireland makes it such that one church cannot be seen to be representative of the whole of the Vineyard movement in the UK and Ireland.

References

Charismatic denominations
Association of Vineyard Churches
Evangelicalism in the United Kingdom